Project "Condor" was an NSA project for the development of secure mobile phones.

See also
 Secure Communications Interoperability Protocol
 Sectéra Secure Module for Motorola GSM cell phones

References

National Security Agency encryption devices
Secure communication